Tarkib (تَرْكِيب) is the Arabic word for construction (primarily syntactic, but also mechanic), assembly. In Islamic context, it refers to the study of Arabic grammar issued from the Qur'an.

External links
Classical Arabic Blog

Quran
Islamic terminology